At the 1930 British Empire Games, the athletics events were held at the Civic Stadium in Hamilton, Ontario, Canada. The programme featured 21 men's events, with all measurements being done in imperial units.

England came away with the most medals in the athletics competition, winning nine gold medals and twenty-five medals overall. The hosts, Canada, were the next most successful and won 19 medals all together, six of which were gold. South Africa were the other nation to take away a large athletics medal haul, having three golds and ten medals in total. Eight nations featured on the medal tally at the first British Empire Games.

South African Harry Hart was highly successful in the throwing events and he came away from the games as the champion in the shot put and discus throw, as well as being the javelin throw bronze medallist. David Burghley took a hurdles double for England, winning both the 110-yard and 440-yard races. Reg Thomas won the mile run and was the 880 yards silver medallist. John Fitzpatrick of Canada won a medal of each colour in the sprinting events, winning his gold with the Canadian 4×100 metres relay team. Englishman Reg Revans won silver medals in the horizontal jumps, while Canadian Len Hutton won long jump gold, but only a bronze in the triple jump. Johannes Viljoen of South Africa showed his versatility by winning the high jump and reaching the podium in the long jump as well.

Medal summary

Medal table

Participating nations

 (5)
 (1)
 (2)
 (53)
 (45)
 (5)
 (4)
 (4)
 (8)
 (7)

References
Commonwealth Games Medalists (Men). GBR Athletics. Retrieved on 2010-07-21.

1930 British Empire Games events
1930
Commonwealth Games
1930 British Empire Games